"Superman" is a 1969 song by the Texas band The Clique, made more famous in 1986 when it was recorded by R.E.M.

It was written by Mitchell Bottler and Gary Zekley and originally released as the first single off of The Clique's first album for White Whale Records.

R.E.M. recorded it for their fourth album, Lifes Rich Pageant. It was released as a single and received a fair amount of radio play, but did not chart on the main US singles chart, though it did reach #17 on Billboard magazine's Mainstream Rock Tracks chart.

R.E.M. version

The B-side to the single, a surf rock instrumental entitled "White Tornado", was first recorded by the band in 1981. The version used on the single was recorded in January, 1984, during the Reckoning sessions, but remained unreleased until "Superman."

The scratchy spoken intro is attributed to a Japanese pull-string Godzilla doll. Translated loosely from the Japanese, it says, "This is a special news report. Godzilla has been sighted in Tokyo Bay. The attack on it by the Self-Defense Force has been useless. He is heading towards the city. Aaaaaaaaagh...."

Cash Box called it "another sparing example of simplicity maximized."

Songwriter Zekley joined R.E.M. on stage during a performance at Northern Illinois University in De Kalb, Illinois, on October 21, 1986.

The R.E.M. version was played during the "Tempus, Anyone?" episode (3x14) of Lois & Clark: The New Adventures of Superman.

7": IRS / IRM 128 (UK)
All songs written by Bill Berry, Peter Buck, Mike Mills, and Michael Stipe unless otherwise indicated.

 "Superman" (Gary Zekley/Mitchell Bottler) – 2:52
 "White Tornado" – 1:56

12": IRS / IRT 128 (UK)
 "Superman" (Gary Zekley / Mitchell Bottler) – 2:52
 "White Tornado" – 1:56
 "Femme Fatale" (Lou Reed) – 2:50

12": IRS / ILS 65025 5 6 (Holland) 
 "Superman" (Gary Zekley/Mitchell Bottler) – 2:52
 "White Tornado" – 1:56
 "Perfect Circle" – 3:30

Charts

References

1969 songs
1986 singles
American garage rock songs
R.E.M. songs
I.R.S. Records singles
Superman music
Song recordings produced by Don Gehman
Songs written by Gary Zekley
Songs about comics
Songs about fictional male characters
Novelty songs